= Dhok Tapialian =

- Town
- Location within Pakistan
- Coordinates: 33.29°N 73.23°E
- Country: Pakistan
- Province: (Islamabad Capital Territory) Islamabad C.T
- Elevation: 578 m (1,896 ft)
- Time zone: UTC+5 (PST)

Dhok Tapialian is a town in the Islamabad Capital Territory of Pakistan. It is located at 33° 29' 15N 73° 23' 5E with an altitude of 578 metres (1899 feet).
